The 2006 NFL season was the 87th regular season of the National Football League (NFL). Regular season play was held from September 7 to December 31, 2006.

The season began with the reigning Super Bowl XL champion Pittsburgh Steelers defeating the Miami Dolphins in the NFL Kickoff Game.

The NFL title was eventually won by the Indianapolis Colts, when they defeated the Chicago Bears in Super Bowl XLI at Dolphin Stadium at Miami Gardens, Florida on February 4, 2007.

New NFL commissioner 
On March 20, 2006, Paul Tagliabue announced his plans to retire as NFL commissioner. During an NFL meeting in Northbrook, Illinois, on August 8, league team owners selected Roger Goodell, the NFL's then-current chief operating officer, as the new commissioner. Tagliabue continued to serve as commissioner until Goodell officially replaced him on Friday September 1.

Tagliabue became NFL commissioner on October 26, 1989. During his tenure, the league added four new teams; saw four franchises move (including two franchises—the Rams and Raiders—from Los Angeles, the second-largest television market in the U.S.); the construction of seventeen new stadiums; began its own in-house television specialty cable network, the NFL Network; greatly increased television rights fees with its broadcasters, including the addition of the Fox network and its NFL programming; and maintained labor peace with the players' union.

Draft 
The 2006 NFL Draft was held from April 29 to 30, 2006 at New York City's Radio City Music Hall. With the first pick, the Houston Texans selected defensive end Mario Williams from North Carolina State University.

New referees 
Bernie Kukar and Tom White retired. Jerome Boger and Gene Steratore were promoted to referee.

Major rule changes 

 End zone celebrations became more restricted. Players cannot celebrate by using any type of prop, or do any act in which they are on the ground. Players may still spike, spin the ball, or (until 2014), dunk it over the goal posts. Dancing in the end zone is also permitted as long as it is not a prolonged or group celebration. The Lambeau Leap, though, is still legal.
 Defenders were prohibited from hitting a passer in the knee or below unless they are blocked into him. This rule was enacted in response to the previous season's injuries to Cincinnati Bengals quarterback Carson Palmer, Pittsburgh Steelers' Ben Roethlisberger, and Tampa Bay Buccaneers' Brian Griese.
 Down-by-contact calls could now be reviewed by instant replay to determine if a player fumbled the ball before he was down, and who recovered it. Previously, these plays could not be reversed once officials blew the whistle.
 The "horse-collar tackle" rule enacted during the previous 2005 season was expanded. Players are now prohibited from tackling a ball carrier from the rear by tugging inside his jersey. Previously, it was only illegal if the tackler's hand got inside the player's shoulder pads.
 To reduce injuries, defensive players cannot line up directly over the long snapper during field goal and extra point attempts.

Officials' uniform makeover 
The 2006 season marked the debut of new officiating uniforms which are supposed to be more comfortable for officials to wear in extreme weather over the old polyester uniforms. The uniforms were designed by Reebok using a proprietary material technology to keep officials both warm and dry during the winter months of the season. On the shirt, the position and number are removed from the front pocket and the lettering and numbers on the back side were black-on-white and are smaller print and the sleeve shows the uniform number. Officials also wore full-length black pants with white stripe during the winter months to stay warm, which was criticized by media. Also, a black stripe was added to each side of the white knickers. This was the first major design overhaul since 1979, when the position name was added to the shirt, but later abbreviated in 1982.

Return of "The Duke" football 

For the first time since Super Bowl IV at the conclusion of the 1969 season, the official NFL game ball was known as "The Duke" in honor of Wellington Mara, whose family owns the New York Giants. Son John is the current CEO of the team. The NFL first used "The Duke" ball in honor of owner Tim Mara (Wellington's father) made a deal with Wilson Sporting Goods to become the league's official supplier of game balls, a relationship that continued into its sixty-fifth year in 2006.

"The Duke" ball was discontinued after the 1970 AFL–NFL merger, and the merged league began using a different standardized ball made by Wilson. The only other time that "The Duke" ball name was used was during the two "Thanksgiving Classic" games in 2004.

One side of the new 2006 "Duke" football featured the NFL shield logo in gold, the words "The Duke", and the NFL commissioner's signature. The obverse side has a small NFL logo above the needle bladder hole, the conference names between the hole, and the words "National Football League" in gold. As per the custom, specially branded balls were used for the first week of the 2006 season (the "Opening Kickoff") as well as for the Thanksgiving Day, conference championships, Super Bowl XLI and Pro Bowl games.

2006 deaths

Death of Lamar Hunt 
Lamar Hunt died in Dallas, Texas on December 13 from complications from prostate cancer at the age of 74. He is credited with challenging the NFL with the formation of the American Football League, which led to the subsequent merger of the two leagues.

Death of two Broncos 
At 3 a.m. on January 1, 2007, Denver Broncos cornerback Darrent Williams was shot and killed in Denver, within hours after the last regular season game against the San Francisco 49ers. Less than two months after, on February 24, 2007, Broncos running back Damien Nash collapsed and died after a charity basketball game at a high school. Both players died at the age of 24.

Flexible scheduling added to regular season 

This was the first season that the NFL used a "flexible-scheduling" for the last few weeks of the season, allowing the league flexibility in selecting games to air on Sunday night, in order to feature the current hottest, streaking teams. This was implemented to prevent games featuring losing teams from airing during primetime late in the season, while at the same time allowing NBC to rake in more money off the higher ratings from surprise, playoff-potential teams that more fans would enjoy watching.

Under the flexible-scheduling system, all Sunday games in the affected weeks tentatively had the start times of 1:00 p.m. ET/10:00 a.m. PT, except those played in the Pacific or Mountain time zones, which will have a tentative start time of 4:05 p.m. ET/1:05 p.m. PT (or 4:15 p.m. ET/1:15 p.m. PT if it is on the doubleheader network). On the Tuesday 12 days before the games, the league moved one game to the Sunday Night Football slot, and possibly one or more 1 p.m. slotted games to the 4:05/4:15 p.m. slots. During the last week of the season, the league could reschedule games as late as six days before the contests so that all of the television networks will be able to broadcast a game that has playoff implications.

Week 10: The Chicago–New York Giants game was flexed into Sunday Night Football at 8:15 p.m. ET on NBC and the New Orleans–Pittsburgh game was flexed to 4:15 p.m. ET on Fox.

Week 11: The San Diego–Denver game was flexed into SNF and the Indianapolis–Dallas game was flexed to 4:15 p.m. ET on CBS.

Week 12:
 The Philadelphia–Indianapolis game was flexed into SNF.
 The Chicago–New England and New York Giants–Tennessee games were flexed to 4:15 p.m. ET on Fox.

Week 13:
 The Seattle–Denver game was flexed into SNF.
 The Jacksonville–Miami game was flexed to 4:05 p.m. ET on CBS.
 The Dallas–New York Giants and Tampa Bay–Pittsburgh games were flexed to 4:15 p.m. ET on Fox.

Week 14: The New Orleans–Dallas game was flexed into SNF and the Buffalo–New York Jets game was flexed to 4:15 p.m. ET on CBS.

Week 15: The Kansas City–San Diego game was flexed into SNF and the Philadelphia–New York Giants game was flexed to 4:15 p.m. ET on Fox.

Week 17:
 The Green Bay–Chicago game was flexed into NBC Sunday Night Football at 8:15 p.m. ET.
 The Buffalo–Baltimore and Miami–Indianapolis games were flexed to 4:15 p.m. ET on CBS
 The Atlanta–Philadelphia game was flexed to 4:15 p.m. ET on Fox.

Final regular season standings

Tiebreakers 
Source: 2007 NFL Record and Fact Book

 Cincinnati finished ahead of Pittsburgh in the AFC North based on division record (4–2 to 3–3).
 Tennessee finished ahead of Jacksonville in the AFC South based on division record (4–2 to 2–4).
 Kansas City finished ahead of Denver in the AFC West based on division record (4–2 to 3–3).
 Indianapolis clinched the AFC #3 seed based on their head-to-head victory over New England (Week 9).
 New Orleans clinched the NFC #2 seed based on their head-to-head victory over Philadelphia (Week 6).
 N.Y. Giants clinched the NFC #6 seed based on better strength of victory than Green Bay (.422 to .383), while Carolina and St. Louis both were eliminated from playoff contention because the N.Y. Giants and Green Bay had better conference records (7–5 to 6–6).

Playoffs

Bracket

Pro Bowl 
 2007 Pro Bowl at Aloha Stadium, Honolulu, Hawaii: AFC 31, NFC 28

Milestones 
The following teams and players set all-time NFL records during the regular season:

Regular season statistical leaders

Team

Individual

Awards 

All-Pro Team

Team superlatives

Offense 
 Most points scored: San Diego, 492
 Fewest points scored: Oakland, 168
 Most total offensive yards: New Orleans, 6,264
 Fewest total offensive yards: Oakland, 3,939
 Most total passing yards: New Orleans, 4,503
 Fewest total passing yards: Atlanta, 2,371
 Most rushing yards: Atlanta, 2,939
 Fewest rushing yards: Detroit, 1,129

Defense 
 Fewest points allowed: Baltimore, 201
 Most points allowed: San Francisco, 412
 Fewest total yards allowed: Baltimore, 4,225
 Most total yards allowed: Tennessee, 5,915
 Fewest passing yards allowed: Oakland, 2,413
 Most passing yards allowed: Cincinnati / Minnesota (tie), 3,818
 Fewest rushing yards allowed: Minnesota, 985
 Most rushing yards allowed: Indianapolis, 2,768

Coaching changes 
 Buffalo Bills – Dick Jauron; replaced Mike Mularkey, who resigned after the 2005 season
 Detroit Lions – Rod Marinelli; replaced interim head coach Dick Jauron who replaced Steve Mariucci who was fired following Thanksgiving Day during the 2005 season.
 Green Bay Packers – Mike McCarthy; replaced Mike Sherman
 Houston Texans – Gary Kubiak; replaced Dom Capers
 Kansas City Chiefs – Herman Edwards; replaced Dick Vermeil who retired following the 2005 season
 Minnesota Vikings – Brad Childress; replaced Mike Tice
 New Orleans Saints – Sean Payton; replaced Jim Haslett
 New York Jets – Eric Mangini; replaced Herman Edwards
 Oakland Raiders – Art Shell; replaced Norv Turner
 St. Louis Rams – Scott Linehan; replaced interim head coach Joe Vitt who replaced Mike Martz who was not allowed to coach due to health problems during the 2005 season.

Stadium changes 
 Arizona Cardinals: The Cardinals moved from Sun Devil Stadium in Tempe to University of Phoenix Stadium in Glendale, with the University of Phoenix acquiring the naming rights
 Miami Dolphins: Dolphins Stadium was renamed to the singular Dolphin Stadium
 The New Orleans Saints returned to their home at the Louisiana Superdome in Week Three. Due to damage by Hurricane Katrina, the Saints' first 2005 home game against the New York Giants was moved to Giants Stadium. The Saints then played their remaining 2005 home schedule at Baton Rouge’s Tiger Stadium for four games and at San Antonio's Alamodome for three games.
 Tennessee Titans: The Coliseum was renamed LP Field after the manufacturing company Louisiana-Pacific (LP) acquired the naming rights

Uniform changes 
 The Minnesota Vikings added trim lines to the outside shoulders and sleeves, and the jersey sides and pants. The horn on the helmet was also modified to be slightly more defined. Purple pants were also worn at selected games.
 The New Orleans Saints began wearing black pants at selected games.

Ticket sellouts 
Through week 11 of the season, all NFL games had been sold out, and for the 24th time, all blackout restrictions had been lifted. The streak was ended by the Jacksonville at Buffalo game in Week 12.

Television 

This was the first season that NBC held the rights to televise Sunday Night Football, becoming the beneficiaries by negotiating the new flexible-scheduling system (it also marked the network's return to carrying NFL games since the end of the 1997 season). ESPN became the new home of Monday Night Football, replacing sister network ABC, who chose to opt out of broadcasting league games. Meanwhile, CBS and Fox renewed their television contracts to the AFC and the NFC packages, respectively. ESPN's new deal was for eight seasons through 2013, while the new agreements with NBC, CBS, and Fox were initially for six seasons through 2011.

Initially, NBC was able to hire color commentator John Madden, MNF lead producer Fred Gaudelli, and MNF director Drew Esocoff from ABC. However, play-by-play announcer Al Michaels remained under contract with ABC/ESPN, and plans were originally for him to be teamed with Joe Theismann, who would be coming over from ESPN Sunday Night Football. In February 2006, the two networks' parent companies, The Walt Disney Company and NBCUniversal, agreed to a multi-asset trade that, among others, allowed Michaels to sign with NBC, while Disney took ownership of the intellectual property of Oswald the Lucky Rabbit (a cartoon character developed by Walt Disney himself in the 1920s) from NBCUniversal. ESPN then opted to go with Mike Tirico on play-by-play, and Theismann and Tony Kornheiser as analysts.

For its new pregame show Football Night in America, NBC gained the exclusive rights from ESPN's NFL Primetime to show extensive highlights of Sunday afternoon games prior to Sunday Night Football. ESPN responded by moving its show to Mondays. Bob Costas became the host of Football Night in America, while Cris Collinsworth, Jerome Bettis, and Sterling Sharpe became its studio analysts.

The league-owned NFL Network was given an eight-game package, consisting of five Thursday Night Football games and three Saturday game that began airing from Thanksgiving to the end of the regular season. The NFL Network hired HBO Sports' Bryant Gumbel as play-by-play announcer, NBC's Collinsworth as the color commentator for the Thursday telecasts, and Dick Vermeil replacing Collinsworth for Saturday telecasts.

James Brown moved from Fox to CBS, replacing Greg Gumbel as host of The NFL Today. Gumbel then replaced Dick Enberg as the network's #2 play-by-play announcer, and Enberg was demoted to #3.

Fox announced that Joe Buck would replace Brown as lead host on Fox NFL Sunday. Because Buck was already serving as Fox's lead play-by-play announcer, the pregame show was primarily broadcast from the site where Buck was calling the game, and Curt Menefee hosted the halftime and postgame segments. Menefee substituted for Buck as the full-time host when Buck was calling the Major League Baseball playoffs.

Beginning this season and continuing until 2012; CBS would not use sideline reporters for regular season coverage.

External links 
 Football Outsiders 2006 DVOA Rankings

References 

 2006 NFL Schedule (Last accessed April 6, 2006)
 NFL curtails end-zone celebrations from NFL.com, March 29, 2006 (Last accessed March 29, 2006)
 Process of game-time decisions will eliminate TV duds, create chaos by Michael Hiestand, USA Today, April 5, 2006 (Last accessed November 6, 2006)

National Football League seasons
 
National Football League